Arthur Douglas may refer to:
Arthur Douglas (sportsman) (1902–1937), Irish cricketer and rugby union player
Arthur Douglas (bishop) (1827–1905), bishop of Aberdeen and Orkney, 1883–1905
Arthur S. Douglas (1860–1949), American artist from Rhode Island
Sir Arthur Douglas, 5th Baronet (1845–1913), Under-Secretary for Defence, New Zealand, of the Douglas baronets
Drax the Destroyer, also known as Arthur Douglas, a Marvel Comics character

See also